The South African Roller Hockey Championship is the biggest Roller Hockey Regions Championship in South Africa.

Regions to compete in the last Season
The regions that competed in the season of 2011 were Northerns, Central, Vaal and Easterns.

List of Winners

Number of Men's Senior Championships by Region

References

External links

South African websites
 South African Roller Hockey Federation
Associação Portuguesa de Futebol Cultura e Recreio (APFCR)

International
O Seculo Newspaper
 Roller Hockey links worldwide
 Mundook-World Roller Hockey
Hardballhock-World Roller Hockey
Inforoller World Roller Hockey
 World Roller Hockey Blog
rink-hockey-news - World Roller Hockey
HoqueiPatins.cat - World Roller Hockey

Roller hockey in South Africa
Roller Hockey
South Africa